Paraptorthodius mirabilis is a species of glowworm beetle in the family Phengodidae. It is found in North America.

References

External Links 

 https://bugguide.net/node/view/498610/tree/all

Further reading

 

Phengodidae
Bioluminescent insects
Articles created by Qbugbot
Beetles described in 1904